Astrid Damerow (born 30 March 1958) is a German politician. Born in Bonndorf, Baden-Württemberg, she represents the CDU. Astrid Damerow has served as a member of the Bundestag from the state of Schleswig-Holstein since 2017.

Life 
She became member of the bundestag after the 2017 German federal election. She is a member of the Committee on Tourism and the Committee on the Environment, Nature Conservation and Nuclear Safety.

References

External links 

  
 Bundestag biography 

1958 births
Living people
Members of the Bundestag for Schleswig-Holstein
Female members of the Bundestag
21st-century German women politicians
Members of the Bundestag 2017–2021
Members of the Bundestag 2021–2025
Members of the Bundestag for the Christian Democratic Union of Germany